Jaci is a municipality in the state of São Paulo in Brazil. The population is 7,196 (2020 est.) in an area of 145.13 km2. The elevation is 545 m.

Demographics

The 2000 population was 5,117, of which 3,973 were urban and 1,144 were rural.  The life expectancy was 73.8 years.  The literacy rate was at 87.42%.

Population

References

External links
http://www.citybrazil.com.br/sp/jaci/ 

Municipalities in São Paulo (state)